Aeger libanensis is a species of fossil prawn belonging to the family Aegeridae. These prawns had very long pereiopods.

Fossil record
Fossils of Aeger libanensis are found in the Cenomanian (Late Cretaceous) marine outcrops at Hjoula and Mayfouq in Lebanon (age range: from 93.9 to 100.5 million years ago.).

Bibliography
 Alessandro Garassino  The  macraran  decapod  crustaceans  of    the  Upper  Cretaceous  of  Lebanon
 Roger (J.), 1946 - Les invertébrés des couches à poissons du Crétacé supérieur du Liban. Mémoires de la Société géologique de France, t. 23, mém. 51, p. 1-92
 Víctor M. Bravo-Cuevas, Katia A. González-Rodríguez, Carlos Esquivel-Macías, Christopher Fielitz Advances on Stratigraphy and Paleontology of the Muhi Quarry from the Mid-Cretaceous (Albian-Cenomanian) of Hidalgo, Central Mexico

References

Dendrobranchiata
Fossil taxa described in 1946
Prehistoric crustaceans